is a subway station in Shinjuku, Tokyo, Japan, operated jointly by the two Tokyo subway operators, Tokyo Metro and Toei Subway.

Lines
Shinjuku-sanchōme Station is served by the following three subway lines.
 Tokyo Metro Marunouchi Line (station number M-09)
 Tokyo Metro Fukutoshin Line (station number F-13)
 Toei Shinjuku Line (station number S-02)

The Tokyo Metro Fukutoshin Line provides through services to and from the Seibu Ikebukuro Line and Tobu Tojo Line in the north, and the Tokyu Toyoko Line and Minatomirai Line in the south. The Toei Shinjuku Line provides through services to and from the Keio Line in the west.

Station layout
The station consists of three separate island platforms serving two tracks for each respective line. The platforms for the Tokyo Metro Marunouchi Line and Fukutoshin Line are interlinked, but transfer to and from the Toei Shinjuku Line requires passing through the Toei and Tokyo Metro station ticket barriers on the main concourse.

Tokyo Metro platforms
The Tokyo Metro Marunouchi Line platforms are located on the second basement ("B2F") level running approximately east to west, and the Fukutoshin Line platforms are located on the third basement ("B3F") level running approximately north to south. They are linked by stairs and escalators at the north end of the Fukutoshin Line platforms and east end of the Marunouchi Line platforms.

Toei platforms
The Toei Shinjuku Line platforms are located on the second basement ("B2F") level to the east of the Marunouchi Line platforms.

History
Shinjuku-sanchome Station opened on 15 March 1959, as a station on the Marunouchi Line operated by TRTA (present-day Tokyo Metro). The Toei Shinjuku Line platforms opened on 16 March 1980. The Tokyo Metro Fukutoshin Line platforms opened on 14 June 2008.

The station facilities of the Marunouchi Line were inherited by Tokyo Metro after the privatization of the Teito Rapid Transit Authority (TRTA) in 2004.

Surrounding area

The station complex extends over a large area, with the Tokyo Metro Marunouchi Line and Toei Shinjuku Line platforms located in Shinjuku 3-chome (after which the station is named), and the Tokyo Metro Fukutoshin Line platforms located in Shinjuku 5-chome. The station concourse on the first basement ("B1F") level is connected to Shinjuku Station in the west by an underground pedestrian passage above the Marunouchi Line, called the Metro Promenade. Another underground passage between the two stations was completed in 2012, situated below the Kōshū Kaidō. The southern end of the Fukutoshin Line platform is linked to the Takashimaya Times Square complex by an underground passageway.

Passenger statistics
In fiscal 2011, the Tokyo Metro station (Marunouchi and Fukutoshin Lines) was used by an average of 97,688 passengers daily, and the Toei station (Shinjuku Line) was used by an average of 50,458 passengers daily (alighting passengers only).

See also

 List of railway stations in Japan

References

External links

 Tokyo Metro Shinjuku-sanchōme Station information 
 Toei Shinjuku-sanchōme Station information 

Railway stations in Japan opened in 1959
Railway stations in Tokyo
Stations of Tokyo Metro
Tokyo Metro Fukutoshin Line
Tokyo Metro Marunouchi Line